Liu Shixiang (born 13 January 1971 in Wulian County, Shandong province) is a retired Chinese long-distance runner who specialized in the 5000 metres.

Her personal best time was 14:32.33 minutes, achieved in October 1997 in Shanghai. She also had 8:55.89 minutes in the 3000 metres and 30:55.83 minutes in the 10,000 metres.

She was absent from a mandatory drug test in 2001 and received a two-year ban.

International competitions

References

1971 births
Living people
Chinese female long-distance runners
Doping cases in athletics
Chinese sportspeople in doping cases
People from Rizhao
Runners from Shandong